Huff Junction is an unincorporated community in Logan County, West Virginia, United States, at the confluence of Huff Creek and the Guyandotte River. The eastern part of the community, along Green Branch Road, is part of the Mallory census-designated place. There are many businesses in this area.

References

Unincorporated communities in Logan County, West Virginia
Unincorporated communities in West Virginia
Populated places on the Guyandotte River